Ryde Racine is a public transportation agency, operated by First Transit, serving the city of Racine and village of Mount Pleasant in southeastern Wisconsin.

History 
The city-owned transit system, which is also a member of the Southeast Wisconsin Transit System, maintains a fleet of buses operating on nine bus routes. The city also provides paratransit services as well as the Dial A Ride Transportation (DART) service, which is still operated under the former Belle Urban System banner.

In November 2010, First Transit replaced Professional Transit Management of Racine as the company to manage the city's bus system. It had managed Belle Urban System from 1996 until 2003 when the Racine City Council awarded the management contract to Professional Transit Management of Racine.
 
In 2017, the City of Racine changed the transit system's name from Belle Urban System to Ryde Racine, and added commuter bus service to Chicago and the North Shore suburbs through Coach USA.

Ridership

See also
 List of bus transit systems in the United States
 List of intercity bus stops in Wisconsin
 Milwaukee County Transit System
 Hiawatha Service

References

External links

Bus transportation in Wisconsin
Intermodal transportation authorities in Wisconsin